Ayikkudi  is a village in the Kudavasal taluk of Tiruvarur district in Tamil Nadu, India.

Demographics 

As per the 2001 census, Ayikkudi had a population of 3100 with 1,573 males and 1,527 females. The sex ratio was 971. The literacy rate was 79.66.

Temples 

Enkan Murugan Temple, Ayikudi Ayyanar Temple, Ayikudi Kailasanathr Temple.

References

villages in ayikudi panchayat 

aykudi,
muganthanur,
kothavasal,

 

Villages in Tiruvarur district